Tomave Municipality is the second municipal section of the Antonio Quijarro Province in the Potosí Department in Bolivia. Its seat is Uyuni.

Geography 
Some of the highest mountains of the municipality are listed below:

Subdivision 
The municipality consists of the following cantons: Apacheta, Calasaya, Cuchagua, Opoco, San Francisco de Tarana, Tacora, Ticatica, Tolapampa, Tomave, Ubina, Viluyo and Yura.

The people 
The people are predominantly indigenous citizens of Quechua descent.

References 

Municipalities of Potosí Department